The 26th GLAAD Media Awards was the 2015 annual presentation of the GLAAD Media Awards, presented by GLAAD honoring the 2014 season. The awards honored films, television shows, musicians and works of journalism that fairly and accurately represent the LGBT community and issues relevant to the community. GLAAD announced 144 nominees in 31 English and Spanish language categories for the awards. It was presented at ceremonies in Los Angeles on March 21 and New York on May 9.

The nominees were announced on January 21, 2015.

Winners and nominees
The winners are indicated in bold.

English-language categories

Special Awards

References

26th
GLAAD
2015 in Los Angeles
2015 in LGBT history
2015 in New York City
2015 in San Francisco
Lists of LGBT-related award winners and nominees